No One Stands Alone is a studio album by American country singer Don Gibson, released in 1958. It was reissued on CD in 2000 by BMG with four bonus tracks.

Track listing 
"Satisfied" (Martha Carson)
"(Prayer Is the Key to Heaven) Faith Unlocks the Door" (Samuel T. Scott, Robert L. Sands)
"That Lonesome Valley" (A. P. Carter, Traditional)
"Evening Prayer" (Charles H. Gabriel, C. M. Battersby)
"Known Only to Him" (Stuart Hamblen)
"Canaan's Land" (A. P. Carter, Traditional)
"Where No One Stands Alone" (Mosie Lister)
"My God Is Real" (Kenneth Morris)
"Wait for the Light to Shine" (Fred Rose)
"Taller Than Trees" (Lee Ferebee)
"Lord, I'm Coming Home" (William J. Kirkpatrick)
"Climbing Up the Mountain" (Lister)
2000 reissue bonus tracks:
"Be Ready" (Audrey Allison)
"Old Ship of Zion" (Thomas A. Dorsey)
"Hide Me, Rock of Ages" (Brantley C. George)
"God Walks These Hills with Me" (Marvin Hughes)

Personnel
Don Gibson – vocals, guitar
Hank Garland – guitar
Chet Atkins – guitar
Velma Williams Smith – guitar
Bob Moore – bass
Buddy Harman – drums
Floyd Cramer – piano
The Anita Kerr Singers (Anita Kerr, Dottie Dillard, Louis Nunley, Bill Wright) – background vocals

1958 albums
Don Gibson albums
Albums produced by Chet Atkins
RCA Records albums
Gospel albums by American artists